Orzeliscus is a genus of tardigrades in the family Halechiniscidae. The genus was named and described by Eveline Du Bois-Reymond Marcus in 1952.

Species
The genus includes two species:
 Orzeliscus asiaticus Lee, Rho & Chang, 2017
 Orzeliscus belopus Du Bois-Reymond Marcus, 1952

References

Publications
Du Bois-Reymond Marcus, 1952 : On South American Malacopoda. Boletim da Faculdade de Filosofia, Ciências e Letras, Universidade de São Paulo, Zoology Series, vol. 17, p. 189-209.

Halechiniscidae
Tardigrade genera
Taxa named by Eveline Du Bois-Reymond Marcus